Your Basic Dave Van Ronk is an album by American folk and blues singer Dave Van Ronk, released in 1982.

Your Basic Dave Van Ronk was recorded in one single night session in London in 1981. It is out-of-print but was re-released along with In the Tradition in 2002 by Fantasy Records as Two Sides of Dave Van Ronk. The reissue does not include "In the Midnight Hour" and "Stagolee".

Track listing 
"God Bless the Child" (Arthur Herzog, Jr., Billie Holiday) – 4:25
"Sunday Street" (Van Ronk) – 3:20
"In the Midnight Hour"
"Stagolee" (Traditional)
"Sportin' Life" (Brownie McGhee) – 4:56
"Cocaine" (Reverend Gary Davis) – 4:30
"St. James Infirmary" (Joe Primrose, Traditional) – 5:00
"You've Been a Good Ole Wagon" (Henry) – 2:52
"Spike Driver Blues" (Mississippi John Hurt) – 4:15
"Gaslight Rag" (Van Ronk) – 2:13
"Candy Man" (Davis) – 3:04

Personnel
Dave Van Ronk – vocals, guitar

References

External links
Dave Van Ronk discography.

1982 albums
Dave Van Ronk albums
Kicking Mule Records albums